Emory J. Arnold (February 15, 1888 - April 23, 1955) served in the California State Assembly for the 75th and 63rd District from 1929 to 1933. During World War I he served in the United States Army.

References

United States Army personnel of World War I
Republican Party members of the California State Assembly
20th-century American politicians
1888 births
1955 deaths
Military personnel from Montana